Guy d'Hardelot (August 1858 – 7 January 1936) was the pen name of Helen Rhodes (née Helen Guy), a French composer, pianist, and teacher.

Biography 
D'Hardelot was born Helen Guy, to an English father and a French mother.  She was born at Château d'Hardelot, near Boulogne-sur-Mer.

At the age of fifteen, she went to Paris, where she studied at the Conservatoire de Paris under Marie Renaud-Maury (1852-1928) and came under the notice of Charles Gounod and Victor Maurel, who were much impressed with her ability. She also met Jules Massenet, who encouraged her to compose. On coming to London, she became a pupil of Clarence Lucas. Emma Calvé was a good friend to d'Hardelot, and did much to bring her songs into notice.

Most of her life, d'Hardelot was engaged in teaching singing and diction at her home in London, and many of her pupils attained success. In 1896, she toured the United States with Calvé. Her first real success as a composer was won with "Because", though her song "Sans Toi" had previously been favorably received. Among her other successes may be mentioned "I Know a Lovely Garden", "I Think", "I Hid My Love", "Dawn", and "A Bunch of Violets".

She was singularly successful as a writer of songs, in which she combined French delicacy with English solidity. Few women composers became more popular in the early 20th century than did d'Hardelot, and her success was won on merit alone. In spite of the help of many friends, it was some time before she achieved this success.

Her sister Edith Dick was also a composer.

References

Sources 
 (Original publication date: February 1911.)

External links

Sheet music for "All for you", Cincinnati: The John Church Company, 1899, from the Alabama Sheet Music Collection

1858 births
1936 deaths
Conservatoire de Paris alumni
19th-century classical composers
20th-century classical composers
French classical composers
French women classical composers
French people of English descent
19th-century French composers
19th-century French women classical pianists
20th-century French composers
20th-century women composers
19th-century women composers
French emigrants to the United Kingdom